Punitovci (Slovak: Punitovci) is a municipality in Osijek-Baranja County, Croatia. There are a total of 1,803 inhabitants.

In the 2011 census, 62% were Croats and 37% were Slovaks.

The population is distributed in four settlements:

 Josipovac Punitovački 
 Jurjevac Punitovački
 Krndija
 Punitovci

References

External links
 

Municipalities of Croatia
Populated places in Osijek-Baranja County